Cybister chinensis is a species of diving beetle native to East Asia.

References

Dytiscidae
Beetles described in 1873